Eric Ehn (born January 29, 1984) is a former American professional ice hockey player. Ehn played college hockey at Air Force, where he was named a was named a Second Team All-American in 2007. After graduating from Air Force, Ehn played for the Bakersfield Condors of the ECHL.

Awards and honors

References

External links
 
 Air Force profile

1984 births
Living people
People from Dexter, Michigan
Air Force Falcons men's ice hockey players
Green Bay Gamblers players
Bakersfield Condors (1998–2015) players
American men's ice hockey forwards
AHCA Division I men's ice hockey All-Americans
Military personnel from Michigan